The Centennial of the Independence of Peru took place on July 28, 1921, as well as in December 9, 1924. To commemorate the hundred years of the country's independence from Spain, large and lavish parties were organized that were supervised and presided over by Augusto B. Leguía, then president of the country.

Celebrations
The city of Lima was decorated for the occasion with electric lights that decorated, among other important buildings, the National Congress, the Government Palace, the Plaza Mayor and the German Tower at the University Park, a gift from the German residents in Lima. Some arches or porticos were also adorned with the coats of arms of the nations with which the emancipation was shared: Ecuador, Colombia, Venezuela, Bolivia and Panama, and which were placed on the avenues most visited by residents and tourists who came for the event.

There were sumptuous parties at the Government Palace, in the clubs, gala horse races, popular festivals, the great military parade, school parades, float parades, and a series of inaugurations. One of the most emotional events was undoubtedly the inauguration of the monument to General José de San Martín, in the plaza that has been named after him ever since.

The Municipality of Lima presented the monument of Admiral Bergasse du Petit Thouars, which is in front of the National Radio headquarters and Washington Square. The Peruvian capital was visited by numerous delegations from other countries, motivated by the good international relations that the government of President Leguía had managed to weave. Subsequently, a book was published in which an account of foreign visits is made, noting not only the number of members of the delegations but also the quality of the characters who came to visit the country.

Foreign delegations

Twenty-nine foreign delegations from countries in the Americas, Europe and Asia arrived, with notable absences from Venezuela (whose government mistakenly believed that the Liberator Simón Bolívar had been marginalized from the tributes) and Chile (which was not invited because it had a territorial conflict with Peru).

Among the foreign ambassadors and extraordinary envoys were:

Foreign gifts
Some foreign residents in Lima, with or without the help of their natural governments, made the decision to gift monuments to the city, at the time characterized for its progressive and French-style character. The offerings of these monuments were made in 1921, but not all the gifts were ready that year: some began to be built on that date, but as their execution took time, they were delivered progressively until 1926, in a series of ceremonies. The original idea had been that these gifts would be delivered between 1921 and 1924, that is, between the centenary of the proclamation of the Independence of Peru by the Liberator José de San Martín, which took place on July 28, 1921, and the of the Battle of Ayacucho, celebrated on December 9, 1924, which sealed the independence from Spain. The resident colonies in Peru that offered gifts were German, French, Belgian, American, Chinese, Japanese, English, Italian and Spanish. There were also countries that gave gifts. Such was the case of Argentina, which after the ceremony on July 28, 1921, left the Tucuman horses, their harness and the spears. with which the soldiers that the homeland of San Martín had sent to remember the liberating feat, paraded.

See also
Sesquicentennial of the Independence of Peru, 1974
Bicentennial of the Independence of Peru, 2021

References

Peruvian War of Independence
1921 in Peru
1924 in Peru
Centennial anniversaries
History of Peru
Peruvian culture